Wenling Tan Monfardini (born 28 October 1972) is a Chinese-born naturalised Italian professional table tennis player.

Biography
Since 2003 she has won several medals in single, double, and team events at the Table Tennis European Championships.

She competed at the 2008 Summer Olympics and 2012 Summer Olympics, reaching the second round of the singles competition both times.

See also
 Italy at the 2012 Summer Olympics

References

External links
 
 
 
 

1972 births
Living people
Italian female table tennis players
Table tennis players at the 2004 Summer Olympics
Table tennis players at the 2008 Summer Olympics
Olympic table tennis players of Italy
Chinese emigrants to Italy
Table tennis players at the 2012 Summer Olympics
Mediterranean Games gold medalists for Italy
Competitors at the 2009 Mediterranean Games
Naturalised table tennis players
Table tennis players from Hunan
Naturalised citizens of Italy
Mediterranean Games medalists in table tennis